Keith Makubuya (born January 26, 1993) is a Canadian soccer player who played in Major League Soccer and the Canadian Soccer League.

Career

Youth
Makubuya began his youth career with St. Catharines Concord SC. He continued his youth career with North Mississauga SC.

Professional
In 2009 Makubuya joined TFC Academy and played for the Academy team in the Canadian Soccer League. In late January 2011 it was announced that Makubuya would travel with Toronto's Senior team to Turkey for preseason training camp, Makubuya was one of four academy players invited to travel. After impressing during the preseason training camp he signed with Toronto FC on March 17, 2011.

Makubuya made his debut for Toronto's first team against the Vancouver Whitecaps on March 19, 2011 as a second half sub for Nick Soolsma. The game ended as a 4–2 away defeat for Toronto in the league's first ever all Canadian match-up.

Makubuya was released by Toronto on November 15, 2012. Makubuya signed for Niagara United for the 2013 CSL season. He scored two goals in the 2014 season opener. He played with the Niagara organization for three seasons failing to secure a postseason berth.

Honours

Toronto FC
Canadian Championship (2): 2011, 2012

Club Statistics

Last updated on August 15, 2011.

References

External links
 

1993 births
Living people
Canadian soccer players
Association football forwards
Soccer people from Ontario
Sportspeople from St. Catharines
Toronto FC players
Canadian people of Ugandan descent
Canadian Soccer League (1998–present) players
Major League Soccer players
Homegrown Players (MLS)